Tomas Csabi (born November 16, 1984) is a Czech retired professional ice hockey player. During the 2002–03 Czech Extraliga season Csabi played one game in the Czech Extraliga with HC Slavia Praha.

Csabi won a bronze medal with the Czech Republic men's national under-18 ice hockey team at the 2002 IIHF World U18 Championships. He skated 19 games in the Ontario Hockey League during the 2002–03 OHL season with the Saginaw Spirit before returning to the Czech Republic.

References

External links

1984 births
Living people
Czech ice hockey forwards
HC Slavia Praha players
Saginaw Spirit players
HC Havířov players
Czech expatriate ice hockey players in the United States
Czech expatriate ice hockey players in Slovakia